Billboard Top Hits: 1986 is a compilation album released by Rhino Records in 1994, featuring ten hit recordings from 1986.

The track lineup includes six songs that reached the top of the Billboard Hot 100 chart, included the No. 1 song of 1987, "Walk Like an Egyptian" by The Bangles, which began its four-week run at No. 1 in December 1986, after Billboard magazine's 1987 chart year had started.

The remaining four songs each reached the top five on the Hot 100.

Track listing

Track information and credits were taken from the album's liner notes.

References

1994 compilation albums
Billboard Top Hits albums